Suiyang District is one of the two districts of the city of Shangqiu, Henan, China. The district was established in 1997. "Suiyang" is a historical name of the Shangqiu city.

Administrative divisions
As 2012, this district is divided to 4 subdistricts, 4 towns and 10 townships.
Subdistricts

Towns

Townships

References

External links
official website of Suiyang District government

County-level divisions of Henan
Shangqiu